"The Drop" is a single by English Grime artist Lethal Bizzle, featuring vocals from British R&B and soul recording artist Cherri Voncelle. It was released on 4 May 2014 for digital download in the United Kingdom. The song has peaked at number 20 on the UK Singles Chart.

Music video
A music video to accompany the release of "The Drop" was first released onto YouTube on 1 June 2014 at a total length of two minutes and fifty-nine seconds.

Track listings

Chart performance

Weekly charts

Release history

References

2014 songs
2014 singles
Lethal Bizzle songs
Songs written by Lethal Bizzle
Songs written by Diztortion